Lansdowne Theatre is a historic theatre building located at Lansdowne, Delaware County, Pennsylvania. It was built in 1927, and consists of a two-story front section with street level shops and offices above, and a 1,400 seat auditorium.  It was designed by noted theater architect William Harold Lee (1884-1971) and is in the Spanish Revival style. In 1987, it was used as the set for Mad Ron’s Prevues from Hell, a collection of 1960’s - 1970’s “Slasher Horror” trailers, available on Netflix. 
Len Cella showed his Moron Movies on the second floor of the theater during the early 1980s.
It was added to the National Register of Historic Places in 1986.

References

Theatres on the National Register of Historic Places in Pennsylvania
National Register of Historic Places in Delaware County, Pennsylvania
Theatres completed in 1927
Buildings and structures in Delaware County, Pennsylvania
Lansdowne, Pennsylvania